Peter Miles Browne (born 1949), is a male former athlete who competed for England.

Athletics career
Browne was the National champion in 1971 after winning the AAA 800 metres championship.

He represented England in the 800 metres, at the 1974 British Commonwealth Games in Christchurch, New Zealand. He won the Middlesex County 800 metres title twelve times and was British League Manager for the Thames Valley Harriers and a Southern, England and British Team Manager.

References

1949 births
English male middle-distance runners
Athletes (track and field) at the 1974 British Commonwealth Games
Living people
Commonwealth Games competitors for England